Isokan is a Local Government Area in Osun State, Nigeria. Its headquarters are in the town of Apomu at.

It has an area of 179 km and a population of 103,177 at the 2006 census.

The postal code of the area is 221.

References

Local Government Areas in Osun State